Asnières-en-Montagne is a commune in the Côte-d'Or department in the Bourgogne-Franche-Comté region of eastern France.

The inhabitants of the commune are known as Asniérois or Asniéroises.

Geography
Asnières-en-Montagne is located some 25 km south-east of Tonnerre and 10 km north by north-west of Montbard. The western and northern borders of the commune are the boundaries between the departments of Côte-d'Or and Yonne. Access to the commune is by the D5 road from Montbard in the south passing through the east of the commune and continuing to Laignes in the north-east. Access to the village is by the D119 road from Ravières in the west passing through the village and continuing south-east to join the D5 near the commune border. The D5D also links the D5 at the northern border to the village then continues south-west to join the D905 between Perrigny-sur-Armançon and Nuits. The commune is almost surrounded on all sides by forests which cover about 60% of its area with the central area of the commune farmland.

Neighbouring communes and villages

Administration

List of Successive Mayors

Demography
In 2017 the commune had 191 inhabitants.

Culture and heritage

Civil heritage
The Chateau de Rochefort (16th century), the ruins of the chateau were restored by Les Clefs de Rochefort. together with the REMPART Union.

Chateau de Rochefort Gallery

Religious heritage
Two religious structures are registered as historical monuments. These are:
Parish Church of Saint Pierre (14th century)
Cemetery Cross (16th century)

The church contains several items that are registered as historical objects. These are:
Cemetery Cross (17th century)
Statue: Christ on the cross (17th century)
Statue: Saint Mammès (16th century)
Statue: Saint Roch (16th century)
Statue: Saint Sebastian (16th century)
Statue: Saint Barbe (16th century)
Statue: Saint Antoine (16th century)
Statue: Saint Jean-Baptiste (15th century)
Statue: Saint Jean de Réome (15th century)
Statue: Saint Pierre (15th century)
Statue: Virgin of mercy (15th century)
Statue: Virgin of pity (15th century)
Statue: Virgin and child (15th century)

Notable people linked to the commune
Guy de Rochefort
Pierre Clairambault (1651-1740), Genealogist

See also
Communes of the Côte-d'Or department

References

External links
Asnières-en-Montagne on Géoportail, National Geographic Institute (IGN) website 
Ameres on the 1750 Cassini Map

Communes of Côte-d'Or